Bamboo palm is a plant name applied to certain genera and species of palm trees.  They are unrelated to true bamboos.
 Chamaedorea, specifically Chamaedorea seifrizii
 Dypsis, specifically Dypsis lutescens, native to Madagascar
 Raphia, specifically Raphia vinifera, native to Nigeria
 Rhapis excelsa, probably native to southern China and Taiwan